Eyrie Bay is a bay,  wide at its mouth and extending  inland, lying north of Jade Point on Yatrus Promontory, Trinity Peninsula in Antarctica. It was so named by the UK Antarctic Place-Names Committee after an eagle's eyrie because of the proximity to Eagle Island.

Map
 Trinity Peninsula. Scale 1:250000 topographic map No. 5697. Institut für Angewandte Geodäsie and British Antarctic Survey, 1996.

References 

Bays of Trinity Peninsula